The Udaipur House is the former residence of the Maharana of Udaipur in Delhi.

The Udaipur House is spread across an area of nearly 12,000 sq meters close to Delhi's Tis Hazari court. It was in the possession of the Delhi government, although the Rajasthan government claimed it.

See also 
 Hyderabad House
 Bikaner House
 Baroda House
 Jaipur House
 Patiala House

References 

Royal residences in Delhi